Edwin Honig (September 3, 1919 – May 25, 2011) was an American poet, playwright, and translator.

Life
Honig was born in Brooklyn, New York. He earned a bachelor's degree from the University of Wisconsin in 1941 and, after Army service in Europe during World War II, a master’s in English from Wisconsin.
He published ten books of poetry, eight books of translation, five books of criticism and fiction, three books of plays.

He  taught at Harvard University and Brown University, where he started the Graduate Writing Program, and was Emeritus Professor.  He was on the Advisory Board of the Christopher Isherwood Foundation.

His work appeared in AGNI and Nedge magazines.

Professor Honig’s first wife, Charlotte, died in the early 1960s. His second marriage, to Margot Dennes, ended in divorce in the early 1980s.

Following an illness, cited by a family friend as complications from Alzheimer's disease, Honig died on May 25, 2011.  Professor Honig's survivors include his sister, Lila Putnam, and his two adopted sons from his marriage to Ms. Dennes, Daniel (born 1965) and Jeremy (born 1967).

In 2012, filmmaker Alan Berliner completed a documentary feature film about Honig and Honig's loss of memory due to Alzheimer's titled, First Cousin Once Removed.  Berliner's mother was Honig's first cousin.  The film premiered at the New York Film Festival on October 9.

Awards
 1948 Guggenheim Fellowship
 writer-in-residence Mishkenot Sha'ananim
 The National Endowment for the Arts
 The Academy and Institute of Arts and Letters
 1986 he was knighted by the President of Portugal for his work in literary translation
 1996 by the King of Spain
 1968-1969 Amy Lowell Poetry Travelling Scholarship
 Governor's Medal (Rhode Island)
 Golden Rose of the New England Poetry Club

Work

Poetry
 
 
 
 
 
 
 
 
  with illustrations by Jean Zaleski

Plays
 The Widow (verse play), first produced in San Francisco, CA, 1953.
 Calisto and Melibea (libretto; first produced in Davis, CA, 1979), Hellcoal Press (Providence, RI), 1972.

Translations
 
 
 
 
 
 
 (With A. S. Trueblood)

Criticism

References

External links
 "Edwin Honig (1919 - )", The Poetry Foundation
 The "Calisto and Melibea" of Edwin Honig, Joseph Snow, University of Georgia
 Edwin Honig's obituary
 Blog post on PBS.org on First Cousin Once Removed

Harvard University faculty
Brown University faculty
20th-century American poets
1919 births
2011 deaths
American essayists
20th-century American translators
Portuguese–English translators
Spanish–English translators
Deaths from dementia in Rhode Island
Deaths from Alzheimer's disease
Translators of Fernando Pessoa
Writers from Brooklyn
United States Army personnel of World War II